Ormancık is a village in the Savur District of the Mardin Province of Turkey. The village is populated by Kurds of the  Dereverî tribe and had a population of 31 in 2021.

History 
On 21 January 1994 it was reportedly attacked with grenades by the PKK. Nineteen people, composed of nine women, six children and four village guards - were killed in what Human Rights Watch described as a "massacre." There is speculation that the event was a chemical attack.

References 

Kurdish settlements in Mardin Province
Savur District
Villages in Savur District
Massacres in Turkey
Massacres in 1994
1994 murders in Turkey
Kurdistan Workers' Party attacks
Chemical weapons attacks